The following is a list of modernist composers.

In music, modernism is an aesthetic stance underlying the period of change and development in musical language that occurred around the turn of the 20th century, a period of diverse reactions in challenging and reinterpreting older categories of music, innovations that led to new ways of organizing and approaching harmonic, melodic, sonic, and rhythmic aspects of music, and changes in aesthetic worldviews in close relation to the larger identifiable period of modernism in the arts of the time. The operative word most associated with it is "innovation". Its leading feature is a "linguistic plurality", which is to say that no one music genre ever assumed a dominant position.

 Examples include the celebration of Arnold Schoenberg's rejection of tonality in chromatic post-tonal and twelve-tone works and Igor Stravinsky's move away from metrical rhythm.

Australia

Australia
Roy Agnew (1891–1944)
Arthur Benjamin (1893–1960)
Hooper Brewster-Jones (1887–1949)
Peggy Glanville-Hicks (1912–1990)
Percy Grainger (1882–1961)
Margaret Sutherland (1897–1984)

Europe

Austria
Alban Berg (1885–1935) 
Ernst Krenek (1900–1991)
Gustav Mahler (1860–1911)
Arnold Schoenberg (1874–1951)
Anton Webern (1883–1945)
Alexander Zemlinsky (1871–1942)

Belgium
Karel Goeyvaerts (1923–1993)

Finland
Erik Bergman (1911–2006)
Aarre Merikanto (1893–1958)

France
Claude Debussy (1862–1918)
André Jolivet (1905–1974)
Charles Koechlin (1867–1950)
Olivier Messiaen (1908–1992)
Darius Milhaud (1892–1974)
Francis Poulenc (1899–1963)
Maurice Ravel (1875–1937)
Erik Satie (1866–1925)
Edgard Varèse (1883–1965)

Germany
Paul Hindemith (1895–1963)
Hans Pfitzner (1869–1949)
Max Reger (1873–1916)
Franz Schreker (1878–1934)
Richard Strauss (1864–1949)

Greece
Nikos Skalkottas (1904–1949)

Hungary
Béla Bartók (1881–1945)

Italy
Ferruccio Busoni (1866–1924)

Poland
Karol Szymanowski (1882–1937)

Russia
Edison Denisov (1929–1996)
Leo Ornstein (1893–2002)
Sergei Prokofiev (1891–1953)
Alexander Scriabin (1872–1915)
Igor Stravinsky (1882–1971)
Andrei Volkonsky (1933–2008)

Switzerland

Arthur Honegger (1892–1955)

North America

United States
George Antheil (1900–1959)
Milton Babbitt (1916–2011)
Henry Cowell (1897–1965)
Ruth Crawford Seeger (1901–1953)
Vernon Duke (1903–1969)
Bernard Herrmann (1911–1975)
Charles Ives (1874–1954)
Harry Partch (1901–1974)

See also
Modernism (music)
Postmodernism

References
 
 
 
 
 
 
 
 
 
 
 
 
 
 
 
 
 
 
 
 
 
 

Footnotes

Further reading
 
 
 
 
 

Modernist
Modernist composers